Mechanical Man may refer to

 Mechanical Man (EP), a 1978 EP by Devo
 The Mechanical Man, 1921 Italian science fiction film
 Mechanical Man (Oswald the Lucky Rabbit), 1932 cartoon
 Mickey's Mechanical Man, 1933 cartoon
 Bosko's Mechanical Man, 1933 cartoon
 "Ballad of Mechanical Man", song by Quasi on the 1997 album R&B Transmogrification
 The Giant Mechanical Man, 2012 American dramedy film
 The Mechanical Bride, 1951 book by Marshall McLuhan
 Mechanical Man 8, a fictional character in the Dragonball franchise